Fantômette is a series of 52 volumes created in 1961 by Georges Chaulet. The books were destined for young readers and feature a female superhero named Fantômette. It was published in the "Bibliothèque rose" series from Hachette Editions. Fantomette's alter ego, Françoise Dupont, is a girl of about twelve years who dresses up in order to fight crime. She has two sidekicks: Ficelle, a tall and not-very-bright blonde, and Boulotte, a short and chubby brunette who is fixated on food. Neither of them are aware of her secret identity, despite meeting Fantômette regularly.

Fantômette was the first female superhero in French literature. The Fantômette books were aimed at eight- to twelve-year-old girls. There are 52 books in the series, which is still published today, as well as a comic book series by François Craenhals, a 1993 live-action TV series starring Katia Sourzac, and a cartoon series in 1998.

In 1957, the author, Georges Chaulet (1931–2012), proposed his first series, Les 4 As au collège, to Hachette, one of the biggest French publishers. But Hachette refused, having just bought the rights to all of Enid Blyton's novels, most notably The Famous Five. It was finally Casterman, a French-Belgian publisher, that published it. Very quickly, Les 4 As au collège was adapted as a comic book.

Strengthened by this first success, George Chaulet then proposed a new series to Hachette, this time accepted: Fantômette was born. Forty-nine volumes were then published from 1961 to 1987 in the Bibliothèque rose series. In 2006, to celebrate the 150 years of the Bibliothèque rose and after an eighteen-year absence, Georges Chaulet wrote a new adventure for his favorite heroine: Le Retour de Fantômette. He died on 13 October 2012, having written more than one hundred fifty books for youth in the course of his career.

List of titles 

Here is the complete list of the Fantômette novels in their original order of publication:
 1961: Les Exploits de Fantômette
 1962: Fantômette contre le hibou (July 1962)
 1963: Fantômette contre le géant (January 1963) 
 1963: Fantômette au carnaval (September 1963)
 1964: Fantômette et l'Île de la sorcière (August 1964)
 1964: Fantômette contre Fantômette 
 1965: Pas de vacances pour Fantômette 
 1966: Fantômette et la Télévision 
 1966: Opération Fantômette 
 1967: Les Sept Fantômettes 
 1967: Fantômette et la Dent du Diable 
 1968: Fantômette et son prince 
 1968: Fantômette et le Brigand 
 1969: Fantômette et la Lampe merveilleuse 
 1970: Fantômette chez le roi 
 1970: Fantômette et le Trésor du pharaon 
 1971: Fantômette et la Maison hantée 
 1971: Fantômette à la Mer de sable
 1971: Fantômette contre la Main Jaune
 1972: Fantômette viendra ce soir
 1972: Fantômette dans le piège
 1973: Fantômette et le Secret du désert
 1973: Fantômette et le Masque d'argent
 1973: Fantômette chez les corsaires (October 1973)
 1974: Fantômette contre Charlemagne (March 1974)
 1974: Fantômette et la Grosse Bête 
 1974: Fantômette et le Palais sous la mer 
 1975: Fantômette contre Diabola 
 1975: Appelez Fantômette !
 1975: Olé, Fantômette !
 1976: Fantômette brise la glace
 1976: Les Carnets de Fantômette
 1977: C'est quelqu'un, Fantômette !
 1977: Fantômette dans l'espace
 1977: Fantômette fait tout sauter
 1978: Fantastique Fantômette
 1978: Fantômette et les 40 Milliards
 1979: L'Almanach de Fantômette
 1979: Fantômette en plein mystère
 1979: Fantômette et le Mystère de la tour (August 1979)
 1980: Fantômette et le Dragon d'or (June 1980)
 1981: Fantômette contre Satanix (April 1981)
 1982: Fantômette et la Couronne (January 1982)
 1982: Mission impossible pour Fantômette (October 1982)
 1983: Fantômette en danger (October 1983)
 1984: Fantômette et le Château mystérieux
 1984: Fantômette ouvre l'œil
 1985: Fantômette s'envole
 1987: C'est toi Fantômette !
 2006: Le Retour de Fantômette
 2007: Fantômette a la main verte
 2009: Fantômette et le Magicien
 Hors-Serie (2011): Les Secrets de Fantômette (encyclopedia on the adventures of Fantômette containing an original novel: Fantômette amoureuse)

Adaptations

Live-action TV series
The series was first adapted in 1993 (21 episodes of 24 minutes) starring Katia Sourzac. It uses the characters from the novel in original new adventures. The series was first aired on the French channels France 3 and Canal J on 20 April 1993.

 Title: Fantômette
 Realisation: Christiane Spiero, Marco Pauly, Christiane Lehérissey
 Scenery: based on the Fantômette of Georges Chaulet
 Décors: Patrick Corrand, Christian Siret, Patrick Bocquet
 Photography: Jean-Claude Hugon
 Production: Les Films du 3e étage, France 3, Méditerranée Films Productions, IMA Productions
 Country: France
 Language: French
 Number of episodes: 21 (2 seasons)
 Length of episodes: 24 minutes
 Date of first airing: 20 April 1993

Cartoon
An animated series of 26 episodes of 25 minutes each was produced in 1999. The settings are drastically different from the ones of the novels. The action takes place in an international metropolis named Furtive-Ville instead of the small fictive French city of Framboisy. The young characters have families, sometimes parents in the animated series when they had none and lived independently in the novels. (For example, Œil-de-Lynx becomes Ficelle and Boulotte's brother whereas in the books, there was absolutely no family bond between them at all). Françoise is even given a particularly dramatic family past (dead Egyptologists for parents), something that  does not exist in the books. Boulotte lose her obsession with food, having instead a passion for animals, while Ficelle appear much more intelligent than in the novels.

As far as graphism goes, the Fantômette of the animated series is heavily influenced by the American animated series of the time such as Batman.

Comic books
A series of comic books following the original scenarios of Georges Chaulet was published from 1982 to 1985 for a total of four albums, drawn by François Craenhals for the first three albums and Endry for the last one.

 Fantômette se déchaîne, Hachette, May 1982 
 Fantomette livre bataille, Hachette, September 1982 
 Fantômette risque tout, Hachette, March 1983 
 Fantômette fend les flots, Hachette, January 1985

Miscellaneous
Fantômette appears at the end of the film La Femme invisible (2009), by Agathe Teyssier, played by Jeanne Balibar. 
In the French animated series Miraculous: Tales of Ladybug & Cat Noir, the school that protagonists Marinette Dupain-Cheng and Adrien Agreste attend is named Françoise Dupont.

See also 
 List of superheroines

External links
 Fantômette

1961 novels
Child superheroes
French children's books
Female characters in literature
Literary characters introduced in 1961
Child characters in literature
Female characters in comics
Child characters in comics
Novels adapted into comics
Fictional French people
French novels adapted into television shows